ANC is the African National Congress, which became the ruling political party in South Africa in the 1994 election.

ANC may also refer to:

Organizations

 Advisory Neighborhood Commission, Washington, D.C., USA
 African National Congress (Zambia), a former political party in Zambia
 Air Navigation Commission, part of the International Civil Aviation Organization
 Amani National Congress, a Kenyan political party
 Armée Nationale Congolaise, the Congolese armed forces from 1960 to 1971
 Armenian National Congress, a coalition of political parties in Armenia
 Nurse Corps (United States Army) of the US Army
 Assemblea Nacional Catalana (Catalan National Assembly), in Catalonia, northeastern Spain
 The Association of Noise Consultants, a UK-based organisation of companies
 Australian Navy Cadets, voluntary youth organisation

Companies

 ANC Rental, a former rental car corporation
 Agilent Technologies, an American technology company
 All News Channel, a former TV channel
 ANC Sports, a sports marketing and signage company
 ABS-CBN News Channel, an English-language news TV channel for Filipino audiences
 Australian News Channel, parent company of many Australian cable news channels

Places
 Ancaster railway station, UK, National Rail code
 Arlington National Cemetery, burial place of US Presidents William Howard Taft and John F. Kennedy; northern Virginia, USA
 Ted Stevens Anchorage International Airport, Alaska, IATA airport code

Science and technology

 Active noise control or active noise cancellation
 Absolute neutrophil count in blood
 Acid neutralizing capacity
 All-number calling for telephones

Other
 American National Corpus, a text corpus of written and spoken American English
 Antenuptial Contract, as used in South Africa
 ANC-Halfords Cycling Team, a British-based professional team
 A Northern Chorus, former band from Canada
 African Nations Cup, or African Cup of Nations, an international football tournament

See also

Ant (name)